Ana Cláudia Dantas Gadelha (born December 7, 1988), is a retired Brazilian mixed martial artist who competed in the Women's Strawweight division of the Ultimate Fighting Championship (UFC).

As of 2022, Gadelha works for the Ultimate Fighting Championship (UFC) on fighter development in her native Brazil.

Background
Gadelha had a tough late childhood and early youth. Her mother did not get along with her rebellious character, which, in her opinion, did not fit a girl. Gadelha's wish to practice martial arts was also not tolerated by her parents. Later she came into contact with drugs and bad friends, which forced her parents to take her to Natal to keep her away from these influences and finish high school. This relocation changed her life completely. At the age of 14, she started to work out secretly in a gym. One day Gadelha went to an MMA event in Natal where she saw a female fight. The experience raised her passion for the sport. At the same event, she met Jair Lourenço, leader of the gym 'Kimura Nova União' in Natal, and he invited her to take a class at the academy. Shortly afterward, by sheer coincidence, her father rented an apartment in the Kimura headquarters, and with that, her relationship with Nova União was cemented. Henceforth she dedicated her life to martial arts and never got involved in drugs again. At age 18, Gadelha moved to Rio de Janeiro where she celebrated her successes in BJJ and debuted in MMA. "The sport was teaching me how I should deal with life. Today, I am a completely different person, thanks to martial arts" Gadelha has said.

Gadelha previously trained at Nova União with former UFC Featherweight Champion José Aldo. She is the youngest BJJ black belt in Nova União's history. Gadelha opened her own gym in March 2016 (Claudia Gadelha's MMA & BJJ Academy). In August 2016, she decided to move to Stroudsburg, Pennsylvania, USA, and left Nova União. As of November 1, 2016, Cláudia Gadelha's Academy (now CG Ultimate Fitness Academy) moved to Randolph, New Jersey. By request of the leaders of her training gym 'Luttrell/Yee MMA' Gadelha moved to Albuquerque, New Mexico in July 2017. She also trained at Jackson-Wink MMA Academy which has relationships with Luttrell/Yee MMA.

In early 2018, Gadelha moved to Las Vegas, Nevada, where she trains at the UFC Performance Institute and Xtreme Couture. In spring 2019 she found professional management at 'Dominance MMA Management. They recommended doing her fight camps at 'Nick Catone MMA' in Bricktown, New Jersey under the tutelage of Mark Henry (striking) and Ricardo Almeida (BJJ). The normal training will continue to take place in Las Vegas.

Mixed martial arts career
Gadelha made her pro-MMA debut on June 5, 2008, at Force Fighting Championship 1 against Elaine Leite. She won via armbar in 17 seconds. Gadelha then won her next six fights to maintain an undefeated 7–0 record.

Gadelha was sidelined for all of 2011 due to complications with a vein in her leg. Upon her return, she took part in the filming of Fight Xchange, a documentary series that followed the lives of six mixed martial artists - three Canadians and three Brazilians - as they trained together and prepared for upcoming fights. The series aired on Super Channel in Canada. Brazilian Globo.com repeated the series in February/March 2014 on their 'canal combate'.

On April 20, 2012, at the conclusion of Fight Xchange, Gadelha made her North American MMA debut against Valérie Létourneau at Wreck MMA: Road to Glory. She won the fight by split decision.

In her next fight, Gadelha earned her first TKO win on September 21, 2012, when she defeated Adriana Vieira at Shooto Brazil 34.

In January 2014, Cláudia won the vote of the WMMA press for the 'Fan Favorite Fighter of the Year 2013.'

Invicta Fighting Championships
Gadelha was scheduled to make her Invicta FC debut at Invicta FC 4 against Carla Esparza for the inaugural Strawweight Championship, but a broken nose forced Gadelha out of the bout and she was replaced by Bec Hyatt.

After recovering from her injury, Gadelha faced and defeated Hérica Tibúrcio on May 11, 2013, at Max Sport 13.2 in Brazil.

Gadelha then made her Invicta FC debut at Invicta FC 6, replacing injured champion Carla Esparza against fellow undefeated fighter Ayaka Hamasaki. Despite having a point deducted in the first round for an illegal knee, Gadelha defeated Hamasaki via third-round TKO and earned a shot at Esparza's strawweight title.

On December 7, 2013, Gadelha was again set to challenge Esparza for the Invicta FC strawweight championship at Invicta FC 7. On late Friday evening before the event, Gadelha was taken to the hospital due to gastroenteritis, 
triggered by bacteria, thus canceling the fight.

Ultimate Fighting Championship

2013
On December 11, 2013, it was announced that Gadelha was signed by the UFC along with ten other strawweight fighters to compete on season 20 of The Ultimate Fighter which will crown the first ever UFC strawweight champion. In April 2014 it was announced that Cláudia Gadelha would not take part in TUF 20, but has signed a direct contract with the UFC.

2014
In the UFC's first female strawweight fight, Gadelha faced Tina Lähdemäki on July 16, 2014, at UFC Fight Night: Cerrone vs. Miller.  Gadelha won the fight via unanimous decision (30–26, 30–27, and 30–27).

Gadelha next faced Joanna Jędrzejczyk on December 13, 2014, at UFC on Fox 13. She lost the fight via split decision. After the horn signaled the end of the third and final round, Gadelha punched Jędrzejczyk after the referee had separated the two fighters. Gadelha immediately apologetically approached Jędrzejczyk and claimed she didn't hear the bell, despite being separated by the referee. Dana White later stated in the UFC on Fox 13 post-fight press conference that the UFC wouldn't take any disciplinary actions towards Gadelha, due to her immediate regret shown towards Jędrzejczyk. The judges' decision caused controversies afterward as 12 out of 14 media outlets and the majority of viewers scored the bout in favor of Gadelha.

2015
Gadelha was expected to face Aisling Daly on April 11, 2015, at UFC Fight Night 64.  However, Gadelha pulled out of the bout in late March citing a recent muscle spasm in her back.  Subsequently, Daly was pulled from the card entirely.

Gadelha next faced former WSOF Women's Strawweight Champion Jessica Aguilar on August 1, 2015, at UFC 190.  She won the fight by unanimous decision.

2016
In early 2016, the UFC announced that Gadelha would be one of the coaches, opposite former opponent Joanna Jędrzejczyk on The Ultimate Fighter 23. A rematch for the UFC Strawweight Championship between the two took place on July 8, 2016, at The Ultimate Fighter 23 Finale. She lost the fight via unanimous decision.

On November 19, 2016, she defeated Cortney Casey at UFC Fight Night: Bader vs. Nogueira 2 via unanimous decision.

2017
Gadelha faced Karolina Kowalkiewicz in the co-main event at UFC 212 on June 3, 2017. She won the bout by rear-naked choke submission in the first round. The win also earned Gadelha her first  Performance of the Night bonus award.

Gadelha faced Jéssica Andrade at UFC Fight Night: Saint Preux vs. Okami on September 23, 2017. She lost the fight via unanimous decision. The fight earned Gadelha her second Fight of the Night bonus award.

2018
Gadelha faced Carla Esparza on June 9, 2018, at UFC 225. She won the fight by split decision.

Gadelha faced Nina Ansaroff on December 8, 2018, at UFC 231. She lost the fight via unanimous decision.

2019
Gadelha faced Randa Markos on July 6, 2019, at UFC 239. She won the fight via unanimous decision.

Gadelha was scheduled to face Cynthia Calvillo on December 7, 2019, at UFC on ESPN 7.  However, on October 22, 2019, it was announced that Gadelha was forced to withdraw from the bout due to a torn ligament and a ruptured tendon in her ankle and was replaced by Marina Rodríguez.

2020
Gadelha was scheduled to face Alexa Grasso on January 18, 2020, at UFC 246.  However, on the day of the weigh-ins, Grasso weighed in at 121.5, 5.5 pounds over the strawweight limit of 116 lbs. The NSAC decided to remove the fight because competitors are not allowed to compete if the weight between them is over 3 pounds.

Gadelha was expected to face Marina Rodriguez on May 2, 2020, at UFC Fight Night 174. However, on April 9, Dana White, the president of UFC announced that this event was postponed to a future date Instead Gadelha faced Angela Hill on May 16, 2020, at UFC on ESPN: Overeem vs. Harris. She won the bout via split decision. 13 of 17 media outlets scored the fight in favor of Hill.

Gadelha was scheduled to face Yan Xiaonan on September 26, 2020, at UFC 253, but a knee injury sustained by Gadelha ruled her out of the bout.  The pair was rescheduled to UFC on ESPN: Santos vs. Teixeira on November 7, 2020, instead. She lost the fight via unanimous decision.

On December 17, 2021, it was reported that Cadelha announced her retirement from competing in MMA professionally.

Post-fighting career 
Gadelha is working for UFC after her retirement, with her main role being to develop young athletes in her native Brazil.

Championships and accomplishments

Brazilian Jiu-Jitsu
 BJJ world champion (three times)
 BJJ Rio International Open champion (four times)
 BJJ Brazilian Nationals champion (seven times)

Mixed martial arts
Ultimate Fighting Championship
Competed in and won the First Women's Strawweight fight in UFC History
Fight of the Night (Two times) 
Performance of the Night (One time) 
Women's MMA Awards
2013 Fan Favorite Fighter of the Year
MMAjunkie.com
2016 July Fight of the Month vs. Joanna Jędrzejczyk
2017 September Fight of the Month vs. Jéssica Andrade

Mixed martial arts record

|-
|Loss
|align=center|18–5
|Yan Xiaonan
|Decision (unanimous)
|UFC on ESPN: Santos vs. Teixeira
|
|align=center|3
|align=center|5:00
|Las Vegas, Nevada, United States
|
|-
|Win
|align=center|18–4
|Angela Hill
|Decision (split)
|UFC on ESPN: Overeem vs. Harris
|
|align=center|3
|align=center|5:00
|Jacksonville, Florida, United States
|
|-
|Win
|align=center|17–4
|Randa Markos
|Decision (unanimous)
|UFC 239 
|
|align=center|3
|align=center|5:00
|Las Vegas, Nevada, United States
|
|-
|Loss 
|align=center|16–4
|Nina Ansaroff
|Decision (unanimous)
|UFC 231 
|
|align=center|3
|align=center|5:00
|Toronto, Ontario, Canada
|
|-
|Win
|align=center|16–3
|Carla Esparza
|Decision (split)
|UFC 225 
|
|align=center|3
|align=center|5:00
|Chicago, Illinois, United States
|
|-
|Loss 
|align=center|15–3
|Jéssica Andrade
|Decision (unanimous)
|UFC Fight Night: Saint Preux vs. Okami 
|
|align=center|3
|align=center|5:00
|Saitama, Japan
|
|-
|Win
|align=center|15–2
|Karolina Kowalkiewicz
|Submission (rear-naked choke)
|UFC 212
|
|align=center|1
|align=center|3:03
|Rio de Janeiro, Brazil
|
|-
|Win
|align=center|14–2 
|Cortney Casey
| Decision (unanimous)
|UFC Fight Night: Bader vs. Nogueira 2
|
|align=center| 3
|align=center| 5:00
|São Paulo, Brazil
|  
|-
|Loss
|align=center|13–2
|Joanna Jędrzejczyk
|Decision (unanimous)
|The Ultimate Fighter: Team Joanna vs. Team Cláudia Finale
|
|align=center|5
|align=center|5:00
|Las Vegas, Nevada, United States
|
|-
|Win
|align=center|13–1
|Jessica Aguilar
|Decision (unanimous)
|UFC 190
|
|align=center|3
|align=center|5:00
|Rio de Janeiro, Brazil
|
|-
|Loss
|align=center| 12–1
|Joanna Jędrzejczyk
|Decision (split)
|UFC on Fox: dos Santos vs. Miocic
|
|align=center|3
|align=center|5:00
|Phoenix, Arizona, United States
|
|-
|Win
|align=center| 12–0 
|Tina Lähdemäki
|Decision (unanimous)
|UFC Fight Night: Cowboy vs. Miller
|
|align=center|3
|align=center|5:00
|Atlantic City, New Jersey, United States
|
|-
| Win
|align=center| 11–0 
| Ayaka Hamasaki
| TKO (punches)
| Invicta FC 6: Coenen vs. Cyborg
| 
|align=center|3
|align=center|3:58
| Kansas City, Missouri, United States
|  
|-
| Win
|align=center| 10–0 
| Hérica Tibúrcio
| Decision (unanimous)
| Max Sport 13.2
| 
|align=center|3
|align=center|5:00
| São Paulo, Brazil
| 
|-
| Win
|align=center| 9–0 
| Adriana Vieira
| TKO (punches)
| Shooto Brazil 34
| 
|align=center|1
|align=center|1:35
| Brasília, Brazil
| 
|-
| Win
|align=center| 8–0 
| Valérie Létourneau
| Decision (split)
| Wreck MMA: Road to Glory
| 
|align=center|3
|align=center|5:00
| Gatineau, Quebec, Canada
| 
|-
| Win
|align=center| 7–0 
| Kalindra Faria
| Submission (armbar)
| Hard Fight Championship
| 
|align=center|1
|align=center|1:10
| Piracicaba, Brazil
|
|-
| Win
|align=center| 6–0 
| Alessandra Silva
| Submission (armbar)
| Expo Fighting Championship: Day Two
| 
|align=center|1
|align=center|N/A
| Sorocaba, Brazil
|
|-
| Win
|align=center| 5–0 
| Ariane Monteiro
| Submission (rear-naked choke)
| Itu Fight Championship
| 
|align=center|1
|align=center|2:08
| Itu, Brazil
|
|-
| Win
|align=center| 4–0 
| Davina Maciel
| Submission (armbar)
| Vision Fight 1
| 
|align=center|1
|align=center|1:26
| Boa Vista, Brazil
|
|-
| Win
|align=center| 3–0 
| Aline Nery
| Decision (unanimous)
| Shooto Brazil 14
| 
|align=center|3
|align=center|5:00
| Rio de Janeiro, Brazil
|
|-
| Win
|align=center| 2–0 
| Juliana de Sousa
| Submission (armbar)
| Watch Out Combat Show 4
| 
|align=center|1
|align=center|1:29
| Rio de Janeiro, Brazil
|
|-
| Win
|align=center| 1–0 
| Elaine Leite
| Submission (armbar)
| Force Fighting Championship 1
| 
|align=center|1
|align=center|0:17
| Aparecida, Brazil
|
|-

See also
 List of female mixed martial artists

References

External links
 
 

1988 births
Living people
Brazilian female mixed martial artists
Flyweight mixed martial artists
Strawweight mixed martial artists
Mixed martial artists utilizing Brazilian jiu-jitsu
Brazilian practitioners of Brazilian jiu-jitsu
Female Brazilian jiu-jitsu practitioners
People from Mossoró
People awarded a black belt in Brazilian jiu-jitsu
Ultimate Fighting Championship female fighters
Sportspeople from Rio Grande do Norte